Steve "Snapey" Snape (born 17 September 1963), also known by the nickname of "Snapper", is an English former professional rugby league footballer who played in the 1980s and 1990s.

Background
Steve Snape was born in Manchester, Lancashire, England.

Playing career
Steve Snape played in Swinton's victory in the Championship Second Division during the 1984–85 season and earned promotion from the Championship Second Division to the Championship First Division, finishing runner-up during the 1986–87 season and earned promotion from the Championship Second Division to the Championship First Division, and finishing third during the 1990–91 Rugby Football League season and earned promotion from the Championship Second Division to the Championship First Division. His career with Swinton was brought to a somewhat premature end during the 1992–93 season following disagreements with the club's board, regarding the sale of the Station Road stadium, and the club's subsequent move to Gigg Lane in Bury, Greater Manchester.

References

1963 births
Living people
English rugby league players
Rugby league centres
Rugby league five-eighths
Rugby league players from Manchester
Swinton Lions players